Events from the year 1684 in France

Incumbents
 Monarch – Louis XIV

Events
15 August – Signing of the Truce of Ratisbon
The Hall of Mirrors at the Palace of Versailles, designed by Jules Hardouin Mansart, is completed
The Château de Marly in the Marly-le-Roi commune is completed for Louis XIV
The Canal de l'Eure with its notable aqueduct, designed by the military engineer Lieutenant Général Vauban to serve Versailles for Louis XIV, is begun; work is abandoned about 1690

Births

Full date missing
Jean Astruc, physician and professor (died 1766)

Deaths

Full date missing
Anne de La Vigne, natural philosopher (born 1634)
Claude Bazin de Bezons, lawyer and politician (born 1617)
Marguerite, Duchess of Rohan, noblewoman (born 1617)
Pierre Corneille, playwright (born 1606)
François Pallu, bishop (born 1626)
Peter du Moulin, clergyman (born 1601)
Antoine Gombaud, writer (born 1607)
Edme Mariotte, physicist (born c.1620)
Gabriel de Guilleragues, politician (born 1628)

See also

References

1680s in France